The 1941 Chattanooga Moccasins football team was an American football team that represented the University of Chattanooga as a member of the Dixie Conference during the 1941 college football season. In its 11th year under head coach Scrappy Moore, the team compiled a 7–1–1 (4–0–1 against conference opponents), outscored opponents by a total of 209 to 62, and won the Dixie Conference championship. The team played its home games at Chamberlain Field in Chattanooga, Tennessee.

Fullback Frank Grigonis was the team captain. He played for the Detroit Lions of the National Football League in 1942. Chattanooga players took five of the eleven first-team places on the 1941 All-Dixie Conference football team selected by the Chattanooga News-Press: backs Grigonis and Sib Evans; tackle Tom Barber; guard Slug Burney; and center J.D. Langley.

Schedule

References

Chattanooga
Chattanooga Mocs football seasons
Chattanooga Moccasins football